Umari may refer to :

Places
 Umari, Brazil
 Umari State, a village and former princely state in Mahi Kantha, Gujarat, India
 Umari River, Brazil
 Umari, Central Papua
 Umari, Iran, a village in Bushehr Province, Iran
 Umari District, Peru

Other uses

 Al-Omari
 Umari (fruit) (Poraqueiba sericea), an Amazonian fruit